Baldock is a historic market town and unparished area in the local government district of North Hertfordshire in the county of Hertfordshire, England, where the River Ivel rises. Nearby towns include Royston to the northeast, Letchworth and Hitchin to the southwest and Stevenage to the south.

History and etymology
Baldock has an exceptionally rich archaeological heritage. Paleolithic, Neolithic and Bronze Age settlements show the site of Baldock has been continuously occupied since prehistoric times.

The earliest monument in the area is a narrow cursus, probably from the middle Neolithic. At the beginning of the Iron Age there was a hillfort at Arbury Banks, 5 km to the northeast of Baldock, that dominated the area. In the Late Iron Age (c. 100 BC), the local power base shifted from the hillfort to the vicinity of Baldock. The soil was easily farmed and transportation was more convenient. In the later part of the middle Iron Age (from prior to c.100 BC) Baldock became the site of a large oppidum, arguably the largest such site in Britain. The oppidum in turn became a sizeable Roman settlement, which although not administratively important, seems to have been a significant cult centre. The Baldock area is also host to the highest quantity of finds of ancient coins in Hertfordshire after the Verulamium region. The site was used until the fifth or sixth century. The Roman settlement gradually disappeared and there is no entry for Baldock in the Domesday Book.

Baldock was founded by the Knights Templar (also the name of the town's secondary school) as a medieval market town in the 1140s. It was laid out by the Knights Templar on land in the manor of Weston in the hundred of Broadwater, granted by the earl of Pembroke, Gilbert de Clare, before his death in 1148. The 1850 tithe map, drawn up before the parish boundaries were extended in the later 19th century, clearly shows the boundaries of the land grant made from the manor of Weston in the 12th century; it is a triangular parcel of land beside the old Roman Road, cut out from an older estate.

The popular story for the origin of the name Baldock is that it is a derivation from the Old French name for Baghdad: Baldac or later Baudac. While Damascus was the furthest extent of Templar military activity during the Crusades, they would have been aware of its significance and it was widely regarded as the most prosperous market in the world. Perhaps the Templars hoped that the name would confer a similar prosperity on their own market town in England. Founding contemporaneous documents use the spelling Baudac, but it is first recorded as "Baldac" in the Pipe Rolls of Hertfordshire in 1168.

Walter William Skeat writes in The Place-names of Hertfordshire (1904):

Others, however, consider it more likely that the Knights Templar used a name already in use, particularly since the location was already a crossroads. In addition the settlement was already thriving as a late Anglo-Saxon part of Weston. Alternative etymologies have been suggested, including Middle English balled, meaning "bald", together with Old English āc, meaning "oak" (the site may have been identified by a large old tree near the Anglo-Saxon graveyard or where the Templar church was built); and a conjectured Old English personal name *Bealdoc, from beald, meaning "bold", with a diminutive -oc suffix. These derivations, however, are not entirely satisfactory.

The modern layout of the town and many buildings in the centre date from the sixteenth century, with the earliest dating from the fourteenth century.

It was where the old Great North Road and the Icknield Way crossed. The A1(M) motorway (1963), was called the Baldock Bypass for some years. In March 2006, a new bypass removed the A505 road (part of the old Icknield Way to the east of Baldock) from the town.

Thanks to its location, the town was a major staging post between London and the north: many old coaching inns still operate as pubs and hotels, and Baldock has a surprising number of pubs for its size. From the 1770s until 2008 the high street was very wide, a typical feature of medieval market places where more than one row of buildings used to stand. In the case of Baldock, the bottom of the High Street had three such rows, until Butcher's Row was demolished by the turnpike authorities in the 1770s. In late 2008, a town centre enhancement plan included a narrowing of the road and subsequent widening of paved areas.

Since the 16th century, Baldock has been a centre for malting, subsequently becoming a regional brewing centre with at least three large brewers still operating at the end of the 19th century, despite a decline in demand for the types of beer produced locally. The 1881 Census records approximately 30 drinking establishments (the town's population was at that time around 1900). Throughout the early 20th century a large number of pubs continued to operate, many of which were sustained by the adjacent and much larger town of Letchworth, which had no alcohol retailers prior to 1958, and had only two pubs and a single hotel bar until the mid-1990s. Its larger population had for many years visited both Baldock and Hitchin for refreshment.

The Wynn almshouses, in the High Street, were founded in 1621 and were endowed "To the World's End" by John Wynne, a cloth merchant from London who left £1000 in his will of 1614 for their upkeep.

Since 1850, the town has a railway station which today operates on the line between London Kings Cross and Cambridge. With frequent services to London, including fast services of around 30 minutes, the town is home to many commuters. The station is part of the Thameslink Programme which will connect Cambridge to Farringdon, City Thameslink and Blackfriars via the Great Northern Route. 
There has been human activity on the site well before the modern town was founded. Prehistoric remains on Clothall Common date back as far as c 3000 BCE. Many Roman remains have been discovered in building work in and around the town, and the core of the Roman settlement lies between Walls Field and Bakers Close. Earlier Iron Age remains have also been uncovered in the same general location, which may be the earliest town ever to develop in Britain.

A medieval leper colony, on Royston Road, was located during excavations in 2003, having been thought for many years to lie to the south-east of the town on the former Pesthouse Lane (now Clothall Road), the A507.

From 1808 to 1814, Baldock hosted a station in the shutter telegraph chain that connected the Admiralty in London to its naval ships in the port of Great Yarmouth.

A history of Baldock's Middle Ages was compiled by Vivian Crellin, a former headmaster of The Knights Templar School, while local archaeologists Keith Fitzpatrick-Matthews and Gilbert Burleigh published Ancient Baldock: the story of an Iron Age and Roman town in 2007.

Baldock's position at the crossing of two important thoroughfares, the Great North Road and the Icknield Way has made it a stopping point for a number of illustrious visitors, including Charles I, who passed through Baldock en route for London after his arrest in 1648 and supposedly Dick Turpin. Preacher John Wesley came to the town in 1747.

In the 1960s and 70s Baldock was a centre of laser research at a MOD laboratory called SERL (Services Electronics Research Laboratory). This facility closed in the late 1970s and some projects and staff were transferred to RSRE (Royal Signals & Radar Establishment) near Pershore.

Baldock was formerly the location of a film processing factory which closed before the company (originally based in Letchworth Garden City) could move in; local folklore has it that it was a silent film studio, but this is not the case. The building was then bought by the Full-Fashioned Hosiery Company from Halifax, later becoming the Kayser Bondor ladies stocking factory (which temporarily produced parachutes in World War II). The site was redeveloped to become a Tesco supermarket in the late 1980s, but the Art Deco facade of the former factory was retained and incorporated into the new building.

Another notable building in the town is the thirteenth century Baldock Parish Church of St. Mary the Virgin at the centre of the town. The original church was built in about 1150 by the Knights Templar before being largely rebuilt in about 1330 by the Knights Hospitaller. It is a Grade I listed building.

Malting and brewing were formerly major industries in the town, but apart from some light industry, today it is mostly a commuter town. Baldock also has a prominent roofing merchant.

The original incarnation of the local football team Baldock Town F.C. was formed in 1905. The club disbanded in 2001, but a new club was formed two years later.

Baldock Radio Station, sometimes called Slip End Radio Station, opened in 1929 as part of the Imperial Wireless Chain. That year it made the first successful radiotelephone call to the USA, to the RCA radio station at Rocky Point, New York. A radio frequency control station was added at Baldock in 1938. In World War II, Baldock was one of the Allied radio stations that intercepted Kriegsmarine signals and forwarded them to Bletchley Park to be deciphered. After the war, the radio station joined the International Telecommunication Union. Ofcom has operated the station insce 2003.

To the east of the town there is a large residential estate that was built in several phases. This is known as Clothall Common. An archaeological dig took place in this part of Baldock in the late 1980s.

According to the humorous book The Meaning of Liff, a Baldock is defined as: "The sharp prong on the top of a tree stump where the tree has snapped off before being completely sawn through".

Events
Several events take place in Baldock throughout the year. The largest three are the Annual Beer Festival, the Charter fair and the Balstock music festival.

Baldock Festival 
The Baldock Festival is a cultural festival which started in 1982 and starts on the May Day bank holiday weekend. The festival consists of three weeks of events throughout the town and local area, such as museum displays, wine tasting, whiskey tasting, beer festivals, brewery tours, cricket match, comedy sketches, family quiz night, mystery tour, open gardens, history talks, and several music events, some of which feature local bands. The festival Street Fair is held in the High Street, on the second weekend. Stallholders dress in themed clothing of the street fair theme, in 2022 this will be 'Green' Baldock. 

The Baldock Beer Festival takes place on the first weekend where local and national real ales, real ciders and continental lagers may be sampled.

 Baldock Charter Fair 
Baldock's Charter Fair dates back to 1199, when King John granted to the Templars the right of holding a yearly fair at Baldock on St. Matthew's Day and for four days following.
This would mean the original fair was held on 21–25 September, but with the Calendar reform of 1752 the dates are now 2, 3 and 4 October. Today the principal part of the fair is a visiting Amusement Fair which sets up in the High Street.

 Balstock 
In 2015, the Balstock Festival completed its tenth year, having grown from a small event held in one pub, to a three-day event featuring more than 200 artists held on 13 stages across the town.{http://www.balstock.com/info/history/} It is now Hertfordshire's biggest free music festival with all proceeds going to a nominated charity.{http://www.balstock.com/info/history/} In 2015, that charity was Up on Downs, a local charity which provides which aids families that have children with Downs Syndrome.{http://balstock.com/tag/charity-2/}

The 2012 festival resulted in a dispute between the organisers of the festival and the Performing Rights Society 

In literature
Daniel Defoe, in his book A tour through the whole island of Great Britain, passed through Baldock and commented: "Here is that famous Lane call'd Baldock Lane, famous for being so unpassable, that the Coaches and Travellers were oblig'd to break out of the Way even by Force, which the People of the Country not able to prevent, at length placed Gates, and laid their lands open, setting Men at the Gates to take a voluntary Toll, which Travellers always chose to pay, rather than plunge into Sloughs and Holes, which no Horse could wade through."

Baldock is one of the waypoints on Warren's long drive up the Great North Road, which brings about the occasion for the novel's plot, the rescue of the shipbuilding town of 'Sharples' (Blyth), in Ruined City by Nevil Shute.

Baldock is mentioned frequently in the supernatural thriller The Green Man by Kingsley Amis (1969). The town is the nearest centre to the fictional pub owned and run by the main character "Maurice Allington". The Green Man was later adapted into a television drama starring Albert Finney as Allington.

The author Monica Dickens, who lived in nearby Hinxworth for four years after World War II, refers to her regular visits to Baldock and to The George and Dragon public house in particular, in her 1978 autobiography An Open Book.

Governance
Baldock has two tiers of local government, at district and county level: North Hertfordshire District Council and Hertfordshire County Council. There is no parish or town council in Baldock, which has been an unparished area since 1974. North Hertfordshire District Council has a Baldock and District Committee where the councillors representing Baldock and two neighbouring rural wards meet to discuss local matters.
Parish
The parish of Baldock was created in the mid-twelfth century from the northern tip of the older parish of Weston, around the time of the town's founding by the Knights Templar. The parish was relatively small, being bounded by Icknield Way to the north, Clothall Road (Pesthouse Lane) to the east, South Road / Crabtree Lane to the south, and Weston Way / Norton Road to the west. From its founding until the nineteenth century the town was governed by the parish vestry and county authorities, in the same way as most rural areas; there was no separate borough corporation or other urban authority for the town.

The parish of Baldock was included in the Hitchin Poor Law Union from 1835.

Baldock Local Board (18721894)

In August 1872 sanitary districts were established, with public health and local government responsibilities being given to the boards of guardians of the poor law unions for all areas which did not have urban authorities. Baldock therefore became part of the Hitchin Rural Sanitary District, governed by the Hitchin Board of Guardians. Less than three months later, on 1 November 1872, a public meeting was held in Baldock where the town's ratepayers voted to establish a local board to govern the town, allowing it to become its own urban sanitary district, independent of the Hitchin Rural Sanitary District. The new board came into effect on 30 December 1872, when the Local Government Board gave its consent. The first chairman of the Baldock Local Board was Thomas Rigby Kewley, who was the rector of Baldock's parish church of St Mary's. Kewley served as chairman of the board until his death in 1885.

Baldock Local Board initially only covered the parish of Baldock. The district was enlarged in 1880 to take in adjoining areas where the urban area had expanded beyond the parish boundary, with parts of the five neighbouring parishes of Bygrave, Clothall, Weston, Willian, and Norton being brought under the local board's control from 29 September 1880. The Local Board generally met at the Rose and Crown public house at 8 Whitehorse Street in Baldock.Baldock: Local Board, Herts and Cambs Reporter and Royston Crow, 8 September 1893, page 8

Baldock Urban District (18941974)
Under the Local Government Act 1894, urban sanitary districts became urban districts on 31 December 1894. Baldock Local Board therefore became Baldock Urban District Council. The new council held its first meeting on 7 January 1895, when Evelyn Simpson was elected chairman. He had been the chairman of the previous Local Board. The Local Government Act 1894 also stipulated (at Section 61) that council meetings should not be held in licensed premises. The new council was therefore unable to meet at the Rose and Crown as the local board had done. The first meeting of the new council was held at the town's Reading Rooms on Whitehorse Street, with subsequent meetings from February 1895 onwards being held at the Infant School on Park Street.Baldock: Urban District Council,
Herts and Cambs Reporter and Royston Crow, 8 February 1895, page 6

Shortly after its creation, the new council was presented with the possibility of building a new town hall to provide a public hall and other facilities for the town and a meeting place and office for the council. A fire had destroyed a row of shops in a prominent position at the junction of High Street and Whitehorse Street in the centre of the town, and the landlord, Thomas Pryor, offered to donate the site to the council if they would then build a town hall on it. Through 1895 and early 1896 the council was split on whether it should accept the offer and commit to the estimated £2,000 construction cost. This was the main issue at the council election in April 1896, with candidates presenting themselves as either supporters or opponents of the town hall scheme. The supporters won, and the scheme went ahead. Baldock Town Hall was formally opened on 25 November 1897, and included a public hall, council chamber and office, fire station, and library.Opening of the New Public Buildings at Baldock, Herts and Cambs Reporter and Royston Crow, 26 November 1897, page 8

By 1935 the council had outgrown the offices in the Town Hall. The council bought a large eighteenth century house called The Grange at 14a High Street for £875, converting it to become the council's offices and meeting place. The Grange was formally opened as the council's new home in September 1936.Baldock, Opening of New Council Offices, Biggleswade Chronicle, 2 October 1936, page 3

Baldock Urban District Council was granted a coat of arms on 10 May 1951.

Baldock Urban District was abolished under the Local Government Act 1972, becoming part of the district of North Hertfordshire on 1 April 1974. No successor parish was created for the town, and so it became an unparished area.

Education

Primary education
St Mary's Church of England (VC) Infant School
St Mary's Church of England (VC) Junior School
Hartsfield Junior Mixed and Infant School
St John Roman Catholic Primary School

Secondary education
The Knights Templar School
Brandles School

Notable people
Arthur Archdale (1882–1948), cricketer and Royal Artillery officer
Robert Bennet (died 1617), Anglican bishop and the Dean of Windsor
Sir Peter Bonfield (born 1944), business executive
Samuel Farr (1827–1918), builder and architect
Lizzie Hall (born 1985), athlete; studied here
Reginald Hine (1883-1949), solicitor and historian
Albert Ireton (1879–1947), tug of war competitor and boxer
Keith Milow (born 1945), artist; grew up here
Ben Mosley (born 1981), expressionist artist
Rev. John Smith (1799–1870), Rector at Baldock and the first person to decipher the Diary of Samuel Pepys
Josiah William Smith (1816-1887), son of the above, an English barrister, legal writer and judge
Leanne Wilson (born 1980), actress
Ludwig Winder (1889–1946), Austrian-Czech writer, journalist and literary critic; died here
Marianne Winder (1918–2001), Curator of Eastern Printed Manuscripts and Books at the Wellcome Institute for the History of Medicine; lived here in World War II

Sport and leisure
In the town centre there is a small museum next to the Arts and Heritage Centre at Baldock Town Hall.

Baldock has a Cricket Club with three teams, a Netball Club and a Bowls club all based in Avenue Park.

There is a Non-League football club called Baldock Town F.C. who play at Arlesey Town's Hitchin Road ground. There is a Sunday league football team Templars FC

The 110 mile Icknield Way Path from Ivinghoe Beacon in Buckinghamshire to Knettishall Heath in Suffolk passes through the town.

Nearby villages
 Ashwell
 Bygrave
 Caldecote
 Clothall
 Hinxworth
 Newnham
 Radwell
 Wallington
 Weston

See also
 Jack o' Legs Legendary 14th century "giant" associated with the town
 Baldock Cemetery

References

Further reading
Bramwell G Rudd (2014) Courtaulds and the hosiery & knitwear industry'', ISBN softback 978-1-905472-06-2, hardback 978-1-905472-18-5

External links
 Photographs of Baldock
 British History Online: Baldock

 
Towns in Hertfordshire
Charter fairs
Unparished areas in Hertfordshire
Former civil parishes in Hertfordshire
North Hertfordshire District